The Jezabels are an Australian indie rock band formed in Sydney in 2007. The band consists of lead vocalist Hayley Mary (born Hayley Frances McGlone), lead guitarist Sam Lockwood, pianist and keyboardist Heather Shannon, and drummer and percussionist Nik Kaloper. 

From 2009 to 2010, the group released three EPs, The Man Is Dead, She's So Hard, and Dark Storm — all produced and engineered by Lachlan Mitchell. Two of their releases have reached the ARIA Singles Chart Top 40: the Dark Storm EP (October 2010) and their single "Endless Summer" (August 2011).

They released their debut studio album, Prisoner, on 16 September 2011. It peaked at No. 2 on the ARIA Albums Chart and won Best Independent Release at the ARIA Music Awards of 2012. Their second album, The Brink, was released on 31 January 2014. Synthia, their third album, came out on 12 February 2016.

The band went on indefinite hiatus in December 2017.

History
The Jezabels formed in 2007 after the four members met as students at the University of Sydney. Their music was described by national youth radio station, Triple J, as a blend of alternative rock, indie rock, and disco pop. The Jezabels' Facebook page describes their genre as "intensindie". The band's name is based on the biblical character Jezebel, who Mary perceived as being "misunderstood or misrepresented" and described her as "an example of how women are really wrongly presented". Hayley Mary and Heather Shannon both went to Byron Bay High School and had performed together as a folk duo in Byron Bay. Samuel Lockwood grew up in Bangalow and attended the same school. Lockwood recognised Mary and Shannon when he saw them at university and invited them to join a band for a competition. Mary recalled: "It was a combination of four individual desires to play music and taking whatever opportunities we could find – which happened to be each other ... From there the process has pretty much been one of reconciling musical differences. But we’re getting closer".

On 3 February 2009, The Jezabels' debut extended play, The Man Is Dead, was released independently via MGM Distribution. It was recorded at Megaphon & Production Ave Studios and produced by The Jezabels and Lachlan Mitchell. The lead track, "Disco Biscuit Love", is credited to Shannon, McGlone, Lockwood, and Kaloper. On 6 November of that year, they followed with a second EP, She's So Hard, which included the tracks "Easy to Love" and "Hurt Me". Both received significant radio airplay, including on Sydney's FBi Radio and Triple J. They also received airplay in the US, where in August, they debuted at No. 114 on the CMJ top 200 and reached No. 96 for the track "Disco Biscuit Love". On 22 December, they were the Triple J Unearthed featured artist and described by them as "[d]ramatic, energetic, uplifting, indie rock with a commanding lead singer. We've picked them to play Field Day – a great way to start the new year!". Their EP She's So Hard was the No. 3 most added on US college radio for 2009.

On 1 October 2010, The Jezabels released the third EP of their trilogy, Dark Storm, which peaked in the top 40 of the ARIA Singles Chart. The Ages Peter Vincent felt "[t]heirs is a timeless sound that is radio-friendly: moody female vocals soaring over strong percussion and slow-building guitar and piano/keyboard lines". One of the tracks, "Mace Spray", has lyrics containing "an element of satire. It's hilarious that someone would carry mace spray ... but it's also very sad".

In August 2011, their single "Endless Summer", credited to Kaloper, Lockwood, McGlone, and Shannon, peaked in the top 40 of the ARIA Singles Chart.

On 16 September 2011, they released their debut studio album, Prisoner, which reached No. 2 on the ARIA Album Chart. It was recorded at Sydney's Attic Studios with Mitchell producing and Peter Katis mixing. Vulture Magazines Anna Moull described the album in a review: "a dramatic gothic epic, with a twist of 80's power-house rock. Jezabels singer Hayley Mary sums up their sound perfectly as 'Bronte-esque gothic (and) melodramatic'. Channelling Kate Bush, Freddie Mercury and Cyndi Lauper, Mary’s vocals are a force to be reckoned with". The magazine gave Prisoner 7 out of 10 points. By 31 December 2011, the album was certified gold by ARIA for the shipment of 35,000 units. It received 3 out of 5 points by Guardian critic Caroline Sullivan and 7 / 10 by Dom Gourlay for drownedinsound.com. The track "Endless Summer" was performed by both Josh Pyke and Jack Vidgen.
In late 2013, The Jezabels released a song titled "The End" as the first single release from their second album, The Brink, which was released on 31 January 2014. The songs "No Country" and "Marianne" were inspired by Julian Assange.

Synthia, their third album, was released on 12 February 2016. It was again produced by Lachlan Mitchell (in the Jungle Studios, Attic Studios, and Oceanic Studios in Sydney). Its title alludes to the many new synthesizers that Shannon had bought and to the name Cynthia, which is an allusion to a goddess by that name (bynames of Luna and Artemis), Cynthia Lennon, Cynthia Plaster Caster, and Cyndi Lauper, who is a role model for Mary, not only for her music, but also for her feminist attitude and her commitment to the rights of homosexual people.

The album reached No. 4 in the ARIA Albums Charts. It received 5 out of 5 points by the Guardian critic. Bluesdoodle.com gave it 8 out of 10 points. Reviewing the album song for song, Xsnoize.com's Sandra Blemster compared Hayley Mary to Kate Bush and Chrissie Hynde. She wrote: "On listening to Synthia I feel like I’ve paid a visit to the cinema and watched a gripping, extraordinary film. You know when a film captures you that much and you come out, it’s daylight and your eyes hurt from the sun? That’s how this album felt. Intoxicating stuff: maybe it’s a full moon." Sydney Morning Herald's critic Jenny Valentish wrote Synthia was "everything fans love the band for: volatile, provocative and intelligent."

In an article for student-run newspaper The Observer, John Darr wrote: "[...] "Synthia" is a record that stretches the pop music format to its potential. Every risk it takes regarding song structure, lyrical turns and production style pays off. It is undoubtedly experimental and yet sacrifices no popular appeal in order to be so. "Synthia" is one of the first truly great records of 2016 [...]." The opening lyrics of "Stand and Deliver" paraphrase Shirley Temple's "When I'm With You" from her film Poor Little Rich Girl.

The band entered a hiatus following the tour in support for Synthia. In October 2021, the band announced their reunion with a commemorative 10-year anniversary tour for Prisoner, set to take place in June 2022.

Music videos

The Jezabels have released official music videos for the following tracks: "Disco Biscuit Love", "Hurt Me", "Easy to Love", "Mace Spray", "Trycolour", "Endless Summer", "City Girl", "Rosebud", "Angels of Fire", "Look of Love", "Time to Dance", "All You Need", "Come Alive", "Pleasure Drive", "My Love Is My Disease", "Smile", and "The Others". Two versions were made for "Disco Biscuit Love".

The "Hurt Me" clip was aired on Australian national television for a number of weeks in February 2010 by the Australian Broadcasting Corporation's music video program rage. It was also the rage Indie Clip of the Week in March 2010. "Easy to Love" was aired on rage in May 2010. While not an official music video, their song "A Little Piece" is featured in the Danny MacAskill bicycle trials video "Way Back Home". It is also featured in a video by acclaimed Slovenian dog trainer Silvia Trkman. Her Pyrenean Shepherd, Le, who appears in the video, has gone on to become an international dog agility star. In the opening video on YouTube for Ubisoft's Far Cry 3, the song "Prisoner" is played in a very short version.

In May 2016, "Come Alive" won the "Soundkilda Award" for "Best Music Video" and the "Audience Choice Award" at the "St Kilda Film Festival". In June 2016, "My Love Is My Disease" won an award at the "Clipped Music Video Competition" in the category "best music video (australia)" and "Come Alive" won for the category "animation (australia)". "My Love Is My Disease" features Kenichi Ito, the world's fastest man on four limbs.

Live performances and side projects
The Jezabels state that they are predominantly a live act, and have played the indie circuit around Sydney since 2007. In 2009, they played at the Hopetoun Hotel and Annandale Hotel, to positive reviews. They toured nationally to promote the release of their EPs; in November 2009, they did an east coast tour to launch She's So Hard. In November and December 2010, they undertook a national tour after launching Dark Storm.

The Jezabels have played the Australian festivals Big Day Out, Falls Festival, Pyramid Rock, Festival of the Sun, Playground Weekender, Come Together, Peats Ridge Festival, St Jerome's Laneway Festival, and Soundwave. In 2011 they played at Groovin' the Moo and Splendour in the Grass. In September 2011, they played in Hamburg's "Uebel & Gefährlich" at the Reeperbahn Festival.
In 2012, they were part of the de-Affaire festival in Nijmegen and they also played at Melt! and Dockville in Germany and at Pukkelpop in Belgium.

The Jezabels supported Canada's Hey Rosetta! and Tegan & Sara on their Australian tours. In June 2010, they toured with Katie Noonan and The Captains, and also supported Regurgitator, Bluejuice, Dukes of Windsor, Van She, Sparkadia, Ghostwood, Cassette Kids, Damn Arms, and Josh Pyke. In February 2012, Pyke performed a cover of The Jezabels' "Endless Summer", featuring Elana Stone (The Rescue Ships), on Triple j's Like a Version. In April 2012, Big Scary covered "Hurt Me" for Like a Version. In 2014 and 2016, The Jezabels played two sessions on that show, covering Journey's "Don't Stop Believin'" and "If You Go" by Sticky Fingers, as well as playing their own songs "Look of Love" and "Pleasure Drive".

In October 2010, they played a 13-date tour of North America and Canada as the supporting act for Two Hours Traffic, and returned to America for more shows in February and March 2011.

In March 2012, they toured the US with indie rock group Imagine Dragons. In July 2012, they joined Garbage on their UK tour for four nights, and played at T in the Park on the sixth of that month. In August 2012, they played Lollapalooza in Grant Park, Chicago, and appeared at Osheaga Music and Arts Festival 2012 in Montreal, Canada.

The band appeared as the special guests of Depeche Mode at the latter's performance as part of Depeche Mode's 'Delta Machine' world tour in the UK and Ireland in November 2013.

In 2014, they played at the Glastonbury festival, at the Montreux Jazz Festival, at T in the Park, at Deichbrand, and at Splendour in the Grass.

The band had to cancel their 2016 world tour shortly before Synthia was released, because Shannon needed immediate treatment at the Royal Hospital for Women in Sydney for an ovarian cancer that had been diagnosed three years before. It had been kept private by her and the other band members, because she did not want it to affect her life too much.

In a statement, she wrote:

I have preferred to not let this diagnosis get in the way of getting on with life. I feel a deep frustration at this new roadblock, as I now have to take a step back and undergo treatment. The band means so much to me, and cancelling the tour has been a very sad decision. I am hopeful that in the near future we will be back on the road again playing music we love.

In July 2016, the band announced that Shannon was "feeling strong again after her treatment", and that they would start touring again in September. Shannon had used the pause from tour life to collaborate with Peter Garrett (Midnight Oil) on his solo debut A Version of Now. Hayley Mary supported Birds of Tokyo on Discoloured, a track from their album Brace. Hayley Mary and Michael Dow contributed a track called "Flawless" to the original music of the sci-fi thriller Butterflies.

In September 2017, The Jezabels showed their support for refugees by playing at Sofar Sydney for Amnesty International's Give A Home campaign.

In early 2019, the ACO Collective commissioned Shannon with two classical pieces. "Ricochet" and "Ricochet from a Distance" were inspired by Joseph Haydn.

On 14 October 2019, Hayley Mary released her debut solo single "The Piss, The Perfume".

Popular culture
In November 2011, "A Little Piece" was used for the Under Armour 'Are You From HERE?' commercial that features basketball star Brandon Jennings.  "A Little Piece" was also used in the 2010 Red Bull short film "Way Back Home", set in Scotland's Isle of Skye, and featuring trials bike rider Danny MacAskill.

Australian pay TV provider Foxtel used "Endless Summer" as background music for their summer (2011–12) television content advertisement. "Nobody Nowhere" was used on the True Blood episode "In the Beginning", while "Easy to Love" appeared on the Grey's Anatomy episode "Hope for the Hopeless" in January 2012. In a 2012 episode of the television show Neighbours, Paul Robinson learns that the grades of his niece Sophie Ramsay are slipping and eventually forbids her from seeing a Jezabels concert in the city.

"Easy to Love" was used on Dance Academy as the music to a tribute dance to Sammy Lieberman by his friends. The dance was originally performed by Sammy himself but when he died it was Ben's idea to do a tribute dance.

Mary revealed at a March 2012 show in Sheffield, UK, that the song "Long Highway" was proposed for one of the Twilight saga films, but was deemed "too mature". Mary later explained in a September 2012 interview:

Do you know how offhand that comment was and how many times I’ve had to face it since? I did say that. It was kind of true, but it was also a bit tongue-in-cheek. We were kind of told that might be the reason. It’s a six-minute song, which requires maturity for listening. What they specifically said, apparently, was that the voice was too mature. I don’t know if that means I sound old or I sound intelligent. I’m going to hope that it’s the latter.

"Long Highway" was used in the 2014 Red Bull short film Epecuén, set in the Argentinian village of Villa Epecuén and featuring trials bike rider Danny MacAskill.
The song "Peace of Mind" is used as the final song in the last episode of the Netflix series The Killing (season 4).

In the TV soap Home and Away episodes (#6078 - 6080) shown in Sydney on 22 and 23 October 2014, Phoebe Nicholson (played by Isabella Giovinazzo) has to decide whether to leave her lover Kyle Braxton (played by Nic Westaway) behind in Summer Bay so that she can return to Melbourne and begin an Australia-wide tour supporting The Jezabels.

"Rosebud" was used as the title music for the BBC's coverage of the 2018 Commonwealth Games, held in Gold Coast, Australia.

Band members
 Nikolas Stephan Kaloper – drums, percussion
 Samuel Henry Lockwood – guitars
 Hayley Mary – lead vocals
 Heather Gail Shannon – keyboards, piano

Discography

Albums

EPs

Singles

Awards and nominations

AIR Awards
The Australian Independent Record Awards (commonly known informally as AIR Awards) is an annual awards night to recognise, promote and celebrate the success of Australia's Independent Music sector.

|-
| rowspan="2" | AIR Awards of 2010
|Dark Storm 
| Best Independent Single/EP
| 
|-
| themselves  
| Breakthrough Independent Artist of the Year
| 
|-
| rowspan="2" | AIR Awards of 2011
|Dark Storm 
| Best Independent Single/EP
| 
|-
| themselves  
| Independent Artist of the Year
| 
|-
| rowspan="2" | AIR Awards of 2012
|Prisoner 
| Best Independent Album
| 
|-
| themselves  
| Independent Artist of the Year
| 
|-

APRA Awards
The APRA Awards are presented annually from 1982 by the Australasian Performing Right Association (APRA), "honouring composers and songwriters". They commenced in 1982.

! 
|-
| 2011 || Nikolas Kaloper, Samuel Lockwood, Hayley McGlone, Heather Shannon || Breakthrough Songwriter of the Year ||  || 
|-
| 2012 
| "Endless Summer"
| Song of the Year
| 
| 
|-

| 2015 
| "The End"
| Rock Work of the Year
| 
| 
|-

ARIA Awards

|-
| rowspan="3" | 2011 || rowspan="3" | Dark Storm || Single of the Year ||  
|-
| Breakthrough Artist – Single ||  
|-
| Best Independent Release ||  
|-
| rowspan="8" | 2012 || rowspan="4" | Prisoner || Album of the Year ||  
|-
| Best Group ||  
|-
| Best Independent Release ||  
|-
| Best Rock Album ||  
|-
| Prisoner Album Launch || Best Australian Live Act ||  
|-
| rowspan="2"|Prisoner – Lachlan Mitchell || Producer of the Year ||  
|-
| Engineer of the Year ||  
|-
| Prisoner – Christopher Doyle || Best Cover Art ||

Australian Music Prize
The Australian Music Prize (the AMP) is an annual award of $30,000 given to an Australian band or solo artist in recognition of the merit of an album released during the year of award. The prize commenced in 2005.

|-
| 2011
| Prisoner
| Australian Music Prize
| 
|-

J Awards
The J Awards are an annual series of Australian music awards that were established by the Australian Broadcasting Corporation's youth-focused radio station Triple J. They commenced in 2005.

|-
| J Awards of 2010
|themselves
| Unearthed Artist of the Year
| 
|-
| J Awards of 2011
|Prisoner
| Australian Album of the Year
|

National Live Music Awards
The National Live Music Awards (NLMAs) are a broad recognition of Australia's diverse live industry, celebrating the success of the Australian live scene. The awards commenced in 2016.

|-
|  2017
| Jezabels
| Live Act of the Year
|

References

External links
 

Musical groups established in 2007
ARIA Award winners
Australian indie pop groups
Byron Bay, New South Wales
New South Wales musical groups
Musical groups from Sydney
PIAS Recordings artists
Mom + Pop Music artists
Dine Alone Records artists